The International School Ho Chi Minh City (ISHCMC) is an international school in Thu Duc City, Ho Chi Minh City, Vietnam. The school is owned and operated by Cognita Asia.

They operate under Vietnamese Law and do not recognize Family Court Judgements from other countries regarding the rights of divorced parents.

International School Ho Chi Minh City is the first international school in HCMC and currently enrolls 1,300 students aged 2 to 18 years old from more than 50 countries. Their uniform is a white polo shirt and a blue/gray skirt or shorts. They provide alternate clothing for those with religious requirements. 

International School Ho Chi Minh City is fully accredited by the International Baccalaureate Organization (IBO).

International School Ho Chi Minh City has 2 campus. Primary campus is located in An Phu Ward, Thu Duc City, HCMC open for students from ages 2 - 11 years old. In 2018 they open new secondary campus in Thao Dien Ward, HCMC, 5km away from the Primary campus for students from 12 - 18 years old.

History 
The school first opened in 1993 as International Grammar School located in district 3, Ho Chi Minh City, Vietnam. It's the first international schools in Ho Chi Minh City and is renamed  "International School Ho Chi Minh City", moved to its current location in District 2 in 1997.

In 2011, International School Ho Chi Minh City joins the Cognita Schools Group, a group of over 60 schools worldwide.

In 2018, International School Ho Chi Minh City open new Secondary campus in Thao Dien Ward, Thu Duc City, Ho Chi Minh City, Vietnam.

In 2019, the school celebrating 25 years of learning.

Curriculum 
International School Ho Chi Minh City provides International Baccalaureate (IB) programmes in Vietnam:

Primary Years Programme to students in Early Explore 2 to Grade 5 (ages 2 to 12 years).

Middle Years Programme for students in grades 6 to 10 (ages 12 to 16 years).

IB Diploma Programme or certificates for students in Grade 11 to 12 (ages 16 to 18 years).

International School Ho Chi Minh City is also one of a few schools in Vietnam provides full 3 International Baccalaureate programmes.

Extra-Curricular Activities 
After School Activities 

International School Ho Chi Minh City provides 28 After School Activities (ASA) for student from KG to Grade 12A such as Skating, Taekwondo, Choir, Cooking, Chess, Violin, Model United Nations (MUN) etc. The ASA program offers numerous clubs and activities during the school year, some of which go on to take part in competitions, sporting or otherwise. 

College & University Counseling  

International School Ho Chi Minh City has college and university counseling services to assist students and families when planning for life past ISHCMC. The Counseling Team provide personalized help in selecting colleges and universities that meet each student's personal, social, academic and financial requirements. 

The Advisory Program, directed by the counseling office, provides students with more information about career choices, resume-building, summer opportunities, and general well-being. Whilst the IB DP Coordinator works closely with the counseling office to help students select courses that best suit their interests and abilities. 

Mindfulness Practice

Mindfulness is introduced at International School Ho Chi Minh City in 2013. Since then students practice mindfulness every day. Mindfulness is led either by an advisory teacher, a group of students or ‘masters of mindfulness’. 

Mindfulness classes are not only for students but also on offer to parents, teachers and staffs. 

Air Quality

International School Ho Chi Minh has air filtration systems in their campuses, like most other international schools. This system provides a clean and safe educational environment for students, teachers and staffs, both inside and around the campus.

References

External links 
 

Educational institutions established in 1993
High schools in Ho Chi Minh City
International schools in Ho Chi Minh City
1993 establishments in Vietnam
Cognita